Cyrtodactylus cayuensis,  also known as the Cayu bent-toed gecko, is a species of gecko endemic to China.

References

Cyrtodactylus
Reptiles described in 2007
Endemic fauna of China
Reptiles of China